AABC may refer to:

 Accrediting Association of Bible Colleges
 American Amateur Baseball Congress
 Australian Army Band Corps
 AABC, a pattern of musical phrases forming an incomplete repetition
 aabc, a type of hand based on suit in poker probability
 Arthur Andersen Business Consulting, a unit formed by the accounting firm Arthur Andersen
 Alabama Aquatic Biodiversity Center
 Anger-Aggression Bidirectional-Causation, a psychologic theory by Vladimir J. Konečni